Monreal is a municipality in the district of Mayen-Koblenz in Rhineland-Palatinate, Germany.

Above the village are the ruined castles of Löwenburg and Philippsburg.

Notable people 
 Markus Meurer (born 1959), German outsider artist

References

Mayen-Koblenz